Abramovo is a rural locality (a selo) in Sysertsky District, Sverdlovsk Oblast, Russia. The population was 216 as of 2010. There are 9 streets.

Geography 
Abramovo is located 22 km southeast of Sysert (the district's administrative centre) by road. Lechebny is the nearest rural locality.

References 

Rural localities in Sverdlovsk Oblast